Manslaughter is a 1930 American pre-Code drama film directed by George Abbott, and starring Claudette Colbert and Fredric March. An original print of the film is saved in the UCLA Film and Television Archive. This film is a sound remake of Cecil B. DeMille's 1922 silent classic Manslaughter. Paramount also released a French-language version of this 1930 film as The Indictment, directed by Dimitri Buchowetzki.

Plot summary
A wealthy woman runs over and kills a man in an automobile accident.

Cast
Claudette Colbert as Lydia Thorne
Fredric March as Dan O'Bannon
Emma Dunn as Miss Bennett
Natalie Moorhead as Eleanor Bellington
Richard Tucker as J.P. Albee
Hilda Vaughn as Louise Evans
G. Pat Collins as John Drummond
Steve Pendleton as Bobby
Stanley Fields as Peters
Arnold Lucy as Piers
Ivan F. Simpson as Morson
George Chandler as Roadside Observer

References

External links

 
 

1930 films
1930s English-language films
American black-and-white films
Paramount Pictures films
Films based on American novels
Films directed by George Abbott
1930 drama films
American drama films
American multilingual films
Remakes of American films
Sound film remakes of silent films
Films based on works by Alice Duer Miller
1930 multilingual films
Films scored by Karl Hajos
1930s American films